Girls' Generation's Phantasia was the fourth concert tour headlined by South Korean girl group Girls' Generation, in support of their fifth studio album Lion Heart (2015). The tour was officially announced in October 2015, began on November 21, 2015, and concluded on May 8, 2016, consisting of 13 shows. The tour was their first and, currently, the only tour for the group as an 8-member girl group.

History
The tour was officially announced by their company S.M. Entertainment on October 15, 2015, with two dates in Seoul at the Olympic Gymnastics Arena. This made Girls' Generation the first K-pop group to headline four concert tours.

Back on August 11, 2015, Girls' Generation announced their fourth Japan Tour will start from December 12, 2015, in Nagoya with six dated in Nagoya, Kobe and Saitama. On November 17, 2015, it was announced on Girls' Generation's official Japanese fanclub website that the separate Japan tour announced in August 2015 would be titled Girls' Generation 4th Tour -Phantasia- in Japan and the tour dates already announced would be part of their 4th tour.

The tour was directed by choreographer Rino Nakasone.

Set list

Tour dates

Personnel
 Artist: Taeyeon, Sunny, Tiffany, Hyoyeon, Yuri, Sooyoung, Yoona, Seohyun
 Tour organizer: S.M. Entertainment, Dream Maker Entertainment, SM True (Thailand), MecimaPro (Indonesia), Super Dome (Taiwan)

DVD

Girls' Generation–Phantasia-in Japan is the thirteenth DVD and Blu-ray release from South Korean girl group Girls' Generation. It was released on May 4, 2016, in Japan.

History
The DVD and Blu-ray features their second worldwide tour, visiting more than 7 venues for a total of 13 shows. There will be two different versions: a DVD and Blu-ray version. Both editions will come with footage content, a 48-page photobook pamphlet and a tour documentary.

Track list

Release history

References

Girls' Generation concert tours
2015 concert tours
2016 concert tours